TDP-4-oxo-6-deoxy-alpha-D-glucose-3,4-oxoisomerase (dTDP-3-dehydro-6-deoxy-alpha-D-glucopyranose-forming) (TDP-4-keto-6-deoxy-D-glucose-3,4-ketoisomerase, Tyl1a, dTDP-4-keto-6-deoxy-D-glucose-3,4-ketoisomerase) is an enzyme with systematic name dTDP-4-dehydro-6-deoxy-alpha-D-glucopyranose:dTDP-3-dehydro-6-deoxy-alpha-D-glucopyranose isomerase. This enzyme catalyses the following chemical reaction

 dTDP-4-dehydro-6-deoxy-alpha-D-glucopyranose  dTDP-3-dehydro-6-deoxy-alpha-D-glucopyranose

The enzyme is involved in biosynthesis of D-mycaminose.

References

External links 
 

EC 5.3.2